Anneisha McLaughlin-Whilby (born 6 January 1986) is a Jamaican sprinter. In 2002, she was awarded the Austin Sealy Trophy for the
most outstanding athlete of the 2002 CARIFTA Games.

Achievements

References

External links

Picture of Anneisha McLaughlin

1986 births
Living people
Jamaican female sprinters
People from Manchester Parish
Athletes (track and field) at the 2014 Commonwealth Games
Olympic silver medalists for Jamaica
Olympic silver medalists in athletics (track and field)
Medalists at the 2016 Summer Olympics
Olympic athletes of Jamaica
Athletes (track and field) at the 2016 Summer Olympics
Universiade medalists in athletics (track and field)
Universiade gold medalists for Jamaica
Universiade bronze medalists for Jamaica
World Athletics Indoor Championships medalists
Medalists at the 2011 Summer Universiade
Commonwealth Games competitors for Jamaica
Olympic female sprinters
21st-century Jamaican women